The 1999 Warsaw Cup by Heros singles was the singles event of the fifth edition of the Warsaw Open; a WTA Tier IV tournament held in Warsaw, Poland. Conchita Martínez won the tournament last year when it was a Tier III event. She did not compete this year.

Cristina Torrens Valero won her first WTA tournament, defeating Inés Gorrochategui in the final 7–5, 7–6(7–3).

Seeds

Draw

Finals

Top half

Bottom half

Qualifying

Seeds

Qualifiers

Qualifying draw

First qualifier

Second qualifier

Third qualifier

Fourth qualifier

External links
 1999 Warsaw Open Draw

Singles
Warsaw Cup by Heros
1999 in Polish tennis